The 2017–18 Elitedivisionen was the 46th season of the highest women's football league in Denmark and was contested by 8 teams. Brøndby IF were the defending champions.

Main round
The teams play each other twice. Top six advance to the championship round.

Championship round
Teams play ten more matches. Points are reset, but bonus points are awarded for the placement in the main round. 10 points for first place, 8 points for second place and then 6, 4, 2 and 0.

Qualification round
Teams play ten more matches, the first and second place are promoted to the league.

Top scorers
.

Regular season

Overall

References

External links
 Official website 
 Season on soccerway.com

2017-18
2017–18 domestic women's association football leagues
Women
1